William Dunn (24 March 1865 – 28 July 1921) was a Scottish footballer who played in the Football League for Stoke and Walsall Town Swifts.

Football career
Dunn started his career with East Stirlingshire and became the clubs all time goalscorer. In an era when many goalscorers were left unrecorded Dunn scored a known 128 goals for East Stirlingshire from his known debut on 13 October 1883 to season 1889–90 in 180 games. During his time at East Stirlingshire he mainly played on the wing but also played in the back and Hhalf-back positions.

In 1889 he moved down to England to play for Stoke along with fellow East Stirlingshire teammate Harry Simpson. In his first season with Stoke, the team suffered a truly terrible campaign and failed to gain re-election to the Football League and so joined the Football Alliance for the 1890–91 season. Stoke found the Alliance much easier as did Dunn who scored eleven goals as the club took the title and with it re-election back into the league. Dunn played most matches during the next season but after injury he was released by the end of the 1892–93 season and joined Hednesford Town before ending his career with Walsall Town Swifts.

Professional Baseball
In 1890 Dunn played professional baseball for Stoke in the National League of Baseball of Great Britain.

Career statistics

Honours
with East Stirlinghire
Stirlingshire FA Caps: 9
Stirlingshire Cup Winner: 1885–86, 1886–87, 1887–88, 1888–89
Stirlingshire Cup Runners up: 1883–84
Falkirk & District Charity Cup Winners: 1884–85, 1885–86, 1886–87, 1887–88
Falkirk & District Charity Cup Runners up: 1888–89, 1890–91
with Stoke
Football Alliance Champions: 1890–91

References

Scottish footballers
East Stirlingshire F.C. players
Hednesford Town F.C. players
Stoke City F.C. players
English Football League players
1865 births
1921 deaths
Football Alliance players
Association football forwards
Scottish baseball players